David Purdham (born June 3, 1951) is an American character actor who has appeared in approximately one hundred films, television series and theatre productions throughout his career.

Career
Purdham was born and raised in San Antonio, Texas. His first film role was in 1984, in Lily in Love. Other film credits include Defending Your Life (1991), My Girl 2 (1994), Coronado (2003), and Fracture (2007).

Purdham has appeared in many television shows since 1980. He played Father Emmerich in the soap opera, Ryan's Hope, from 1981 to 1985, and from 1991 to 1992 he portrayed Fred Porter in the soap opera, One Life to Live. He has had recurring roles in Kate & Allie (1987), Babylon 5 (1997), Port Charles (2000), JAG (1997, 2001), The Young and the Restless (2006), General Hospital (2010–11), and more. He has also guest-starred in countless TV programs, such as the cult science fiction series, Alien Nation (1990) as Marc Guerin, reprising the role for the 1994 TV movie, Alien Nation: Dark Horizon; crime shows Matlock (1994), Diagnosis Murder (1997), Boston Legal (2005) and Perception (2015); and comedies Seinfeld (1996) and George Lopez (2004).

Purdham has also starred in several plays—a 1982 production of The Life and Adventures of Nicholas Nickleby (1982), a 1991 production of Absent Friends, and a 1993 production of The Seagull.

Purdham's voice acting includes video games and audiobooks.

Partial filmography
Film

Television

References

External links

1951 births
American male film actors
American male soap opera actors
American male stage actors
American male television actors
Male actors from San Antonio
Living people
20th-century American male actors
21st-century American male actors